A series of writs for the election of the 4th General Assembly of Nova Scotia were issued February 2-19, 1765, returnable by March 13, 1765.  The assembly convened on May 28, 1765, held eight sessions, and was dissolved on April 2, 1770.

Sessions
Dates of specific sessions are under research.

Governor and Council
Governor: Montague Wilmot -died May 23, 1766
Lieutenant Governor: vacant
Administrator: Benjamin Green served as acting governor after Wilmot's death
Lieutenant Governor: Michael Francklin -named August 23, 1766, served as acting governor until Campbell arrived
Governor: Lord William Campbell -named November 27, 1766
Lieutenant Governor: Michael Francklin

The members of the Council are currently under research.

House of Assembly

Officers
Speaker of the House: William Nesbitt of Halifax County
Clerk of the House: Isaac Deschamps of Falmouth Township

Division of seats
An order in Council on January 30, 1765 allocated seats as follows:
4 seats: Halifax County
2 seats each: Annapolis, Lunenburg, Kings, Cumberland, and Queens Counties, and Halifax Township
1 seat each: Horton, Cornwallis, Falmouth, Cumberland, Granville, Annapolis, Lunenburg, Liverpool, Onslow, Truro, and Newport Townships
making a total of 27 seats.

During the assembly, Sunbury County was created with 2 seats and Londonderry, Sackville, Yarmouth, and Barrington Townships were created with 1 seat each, for a total of 33 seats.

(Cape) Breton County was also created, and 2 members were elected, but the seats were held not to exist due to insufficient freeholders.

Members
Annapolis County
Joseph Winniett
John Harris
Annapolis Township
Jonathan Hoar
Barrington Township
Francis White -initial by-election March 24, 1766, took seat July 1, 1767, seat declared vacant November 8, 1769.
(Cape) Breton County
initial by-election, writ issued December 16, 1765, returned March 21, 1766.  Election declared invalid June 14, 1766 due to insufficient freeholders, and these two members were never seated.
Gregory Townshend
John Grant
Cornwallis Township
John Burbidge
Cumberland County
Benoni Danks -took seat June 21, 1766
Gamaliel Smethurst
Cumberland Township
Josia Troop -attended, seat declared vacant November 8, 1769
Falmouth Township
Isaac Deschamps
Granville Township
Henry Munroe -resigned June 21, 1768.
John Hicks -by-election, took seat October 31, 1768.
Halifax County
William Nesbitt
Benjamin Gerrish -resigned June 27, 1768 after being appointed to the Council.
John Fillis -by-election, took seat October 22, 1768.
John Butler
William Best
Halifax Township
Charles Procter
Richard Wenman
Horton Township
William Welch -attended, seat declared vacant August 1, 1767.
Charles Dickson -by-election, writ issued September 28, 1767, took seat June 18, 1768.
Kings County
Winckworth Tonge
Charles Morris (1731–1802)
Liverpool Township
Elisha Freeman -attended, resigned due to age October 19, 1767.
Ephraim Dean -by-election, August 17, 1768, but election disputed October 28,1768. Apparently did not serve.
Londonderry Township
Alexander McNutt -initial by-election, October 26, 1767, seat declared vacant November 8, 1769.
Lunenburg County
Joseph Pernette
Philip Augustus Knaut
Lunenburg Township
Archibald Hinshelwood
Newport Township
John Day -attended, seat vacated in 1769, but no record in the journal why. Other sources indicate he left for Philadelphia.
Henry Denny Denson -by-election October 7, 1769, took seat October 16, 1769.
Onslow Township
James Brenton
Queens County
William Smith
Simeon Perkins -seat apparently declared vacant July 1766, but not directly noted in the journal.
John Doggett -by-election, August 17, 1768, but its not clear if he ever took the seat.
Sackville Township
Benjamin Mason -initial by-election 1766, took seat October 27, 1766; seat declared vacant November 8, 1769
Sunbury County
Beamsley Perkins Glasier -initial by-election, writ issued May 30, 1765, returned Aug. 1, 1765 but never took seat.
Thomas Falconer -initial by-election, writ issued May 30, 1765, returned August 1, 1765 but never took seat.
Richard Shorne -by-election, September 20, 1768
Phineas Nevers -by-election, September 20, 1768
Truro Township
Charles Morris (1731–1802) -elected for both Kings County and Truro Township, gave up this seat.
David Archibald -by-election, writ issued February 19, 1766, returned May 24, 1766, took seat June 5, 1766.
Yarmouth Township
Malachy Salter -initial by-election, took seat October 24, 1766; did not attend after 1768.

Note:  Unless otherwise noted, members were elected at the general election, and took their seats at the convening of the assembly.  By-elections are special elections held to fill specific vacancies.  When a member is noted as having taking their seat on a certain date, but a by-election isn't noted, the member was elected at the general election but arrived late.

References 

A Directory of the Members of the Legislative Assembly of Nova Scotia, 1758–1958, Public Archives of Nova Scotia (1958)

04
1765 in Canada
1766 in Canada
1767 in Canada
1768 in Canada
1769 in Canada
1770 in Canada
1765 establishments in Nova Scotia
1770 disestablishments in Nova Scotia